Moisés Campeny Brugue (born 27 May 1979 in Riudellots de la Selva) is a retired Spanish athlete who specialised in the hammer throw.

References

1979 births
athletes (track and field) at the 1997 Mediterranean Games
athletes (track and field) at the 2001 Mediterranean Games
athletes (track and field) at the 2005 Mediterranean Games
Athletes from Catalonia
living people
Mediterranean Games competitors for Spain
People from Selva
Sportspeople from the Province of Girona
Spanish male hammer throwers
20th-century Spanish people
21st-century Spanish people